Egerton Park is a cricket ground in Melton Mowbray, Leicestershire. The land for the park was purchased from the Egerton Lodge Estate by the Melton Mowbray Town Estate in 1931. Egerton Park was used as an outground by Leicestershire following the Second World War, playing three first-class cricket matches there against Somerset, Lancashire and Kent in the 1946, 1947 and 1948 County Championship's respectively. Egerton Park played host to international cricket in 1986, when Malaysia played Zimbabwe in the ICC Trophy, though the match carried no official status.

First-class records
 Highest team total: 355 all out by Lancashire v Leicestershire, 1947
 Lowest team total: 141 all out by Leicestershire v Somerset, 1946
 Highest individual innings: 102* by Arthur Fagg for Kent v Leicestershire, 1948
 Best bowling in an innings: 7–56 by Jack Walsh for Leicestershire v Somerset, 1946
 Best bowling in a match: 13–107 by Jack Walsh, as above

See also
List of Leicestershire County Cricket Club grounds
List of cricket grounds in England and Wales

References

Melton Mowbray
Cricket grounds in Leicestershire
Leicestershire County Cricket Club
Parks and open spaces in Leicestershire